New World School of the Arts (NWSA) is a public magnet high school and college in Downtown Miami, Florida. Its dual-enrollment programs in the visual and performing arts are organized into four strands: visual arts, dance, theatre (comprising programs in theater and musical theatre), and music (comprising programs in instrumental music and vocal music).

The New World School of the Arts was a pioneer in dual-enrollment education, arising out of an experiment between Miami Northwestern High School and Dade Community College (now Miami Dade College). NWSA was formally created as an outcome of that experiment by the 1986 New World School of the Arts Act of the Florida State Legislature as "a center of excellence for the performing and visual art", with the stated intention "that specific attention be given to the needs of artistically talented high school students who are occupationally oriented to the arts."

The school is jointly administered by Miami-Dade County Public Schools, Miami Dade College, and the University of Florida. The administrative structure includes an executive board with representatives from each of the partners as well as community seats and a foundation board.

The school awards an Associate of Arts degree from Miami Dade College, Bachelor of Fine Arts and Bachelor of Music degrees from the University of Florida, and a high school degree from the Miami Dade County schools.

Admissions into the high school are through the Miami Dade Visual and Performing Arts Magnet Program, requiring an audition and/or portfolio (see High School Admissions).

New World High School is rated #149 in the national rankings for best high schools, #17 in rankings for  best Florida high schools and #42  magnet schools in accordance with the 2018 U.S. News & World Report. In 2009, NWSA was 82nd in this ranking.  Both the college and the high school are accredited by the Southern Association of Colleges and Schools.

History
The vision of PAVAC (Performing and Visual Arts Center) was to integrate Miami Northwestern High School and provide high-quality arts training for students in Dade County. The original PAVAC director (1975) was Jackie (last name unknown), with Dr. Everett Abney serving as principal. At that time, Ms. Samiento served as an art teacher and Charlie Austin as music instructor. Later, Samiento took over as director when Jackie relocated out of state.

In the early days of PAVAC, Irene Fox was the Modern Dance instructor and Shelley Fox (recommended by Carrie Meek) was hired as the ballet instructor-choreographer. After Irene Fox left the program, Shelley Fox continued to recruit students from Dade County Public Schools. She developed a high quality ballet program and performing company.

The PAVAC program provided students with busing from their local high school to Miami Northwestern for the afternoon arts classes. The PAVAC Dancers performed at Vizcaya Museum and Gardens, at locations on Miami Beach, Florida state conferences and festivals, and on local TV stations. The highlight of the program was the premier of Richard Strauss' original ballet Death and Transfiguration at Miami Dade Jr. College North. At that time, the PAVAC ballet program was the only department that successfully integrated Miami Northwestern High School.

Kendell Bently-Baker, inspired by the academic success of that program, and attempting to take greater advantage of the facilities and faculty of Miami Dade College (MDC), then known as Miami Dade Community College, proposed the creation of a dual-enrollment school of the arts: morning academics were to be at the student's home high school; in the afternoon students were to be bussed to one of the two MDCC campuses for classes in art or the performing arts. Upon high school graduation, the student received a diploma from the home high school and college credits for the art classes, awarded through MDC.

In summer 1982, county auditions were held for 10th–12th graders. In fall 1982, two dual-enrollment PAVACs opened, one at the North Campus of MDCC, "PAVAC North", headed by Kendell Bently-Baker; the other at the South Campus of MDCC (now called the Kendall Campus), "PAVAC South", headed by Richard Janaro and Margaret Pelton. Marcy Samiento continued to serve as DCPS coordinator. At that time, many Miami-Dade high schools served only 10th–12th grade.

The first PAVAC dual-enrollment graduates were in 1983. The Miami Northwestern High School program continued as before the creation of PAVAC, and is currently among the PVA (performing and visual arts) magnet programs in the Miami-Dade County school system.

In 1984, Marcy Sarmiento, Kandell Bentley-Baker and Richard Janaro were asked to plan a successor school to PAVAC. Knowing they would need approval from the Florida Legislature they enlisted civic leader and lobbyist Seth Gordon to join them. Gordon was later elected to serve as the first chair of the Executive Board of the school and served in that capacity for six years. They studied other arts schools in the country, visiting LaGuardia High School, Juilliard and the North Carolina School of the Arts. A bill creating the "South Florida School of the Arts" passed the Florida House of Representatives on May 30, 1984. Soon afterwards, the New World name was chosen as part of larger plans for urban and cultural development which included the eponymous New World Symphony Orchestra, and to avoid confusion with the Florida School of the Arts.  The Florida legislature passed the "New World School of the Arts Act" in 1986.

The NWSA opened its doors in fall 1987. The continuing students at PAVAC's North and South transitioned into NWSA, as did many of PAVAC's faculty. NWSA issued its first high school diploma in 1988 to the former PAVAC students. NWSA enrolled its first freshman college students in 1988. In order to award a BFA, it partnered with Florida International University (FIU).  On January 12, 1994 University of Florida replaced FIU in this partnership. The first graduating class of the college was in 1992.

Later the high school expanded to include 9th grade.

Administration 

The combined administration of the high school and college consists of a provost, under which are four deans and a principal. The Principal oversees the high school and high school academics, and Deans oversee each of the four strands, Dance, Music, Theater and Visual Arts, for both the high school and the college. There is an executive board of directors for the school, as well as a foundation board to direct the NWSA Foundation.

Provost 
Richard A. Klein was hired away from being the principal of the LaGuardia High School to be the founding provost of NWSA. In April 1994 the executive board reduced Richard Klein's contract to one year and began looking for a replacement. D. Hansen became interim provost for the 1995-96 school year, replaced by Bennett Lentczner, who served until 1999. Several provosts have served since then. Since the 2009 school year, Dr. Jeffrey Hodgson has been provost.

Principal 
Alan Weiss was the founding principal. Since then, principals have been: Mandy Offerle, 1989–1993; Ellery Brown, 1993 until retirement in 2007; Dr. Frederic Conde, 2007–2010; Lisa S. Noffo, 2010–2012; Evonne Alvarez 2012–2018; Jason Allen, 2018 - 2020; Contessa Bryant 2021-Present.
.

Dean of Dance 

Daniel Lewis was the founding Dean of Dance of NWSA. Daniel Lewis retired for the 2011 school year. The current Dean of Dance is Mary Lisa Burns.

Dean of Music 

John de Lancie was the director of Philadelphia's famed Curtis Institute of Music before becoming the founding Dean at New World.  He submitted his resignation in December 1991 but rescinded it that same month,  then resigned definitively in September 1992. He was replaced by Willie Anthony Waters, principal conductor of the Greater Miami Opera. Waters was replaced in August 1993 with Balint Vazsonyi, who was asked to resign in September 1994.

Since then the position has been filled by: Tallulah Brown, 1994–95; Karl Kramer, 1995–97; Roby George, 1997–98; Mark Camphouse, 1998–99; Dennis Prime, 1999–2002; Jeffrey Hodgson, 2002-2009; Jim Gasior, 2009-2012; and Milton Ruben Laufer 2012-2014.

The current Dean of Music is Daniel Andai, an alumnus of NWSA Music Division. He was appointed in summer 2014.

Dean of Theater 

Dr. Richard Paul Janaro agreed to serve as acting Dean of Theater at the school's inception. Jorge Guerra Castro became Dean of Theater in 1988, and Dr. Janaro assumed the role of Assistant Dean of Theater. In 2002 Patrice Bailey took over from Castro, however she retired in 2022 and has since been replaced by Alan Patrick Kenny.

Dean of Visual Arts 

The founding Dean of Visual Arts was Ed Love. Since then, the deans have been: Mel Alexenberg, 1990–2000; Louise Romeo, 2000–2005; Maggy Cuesta, 2005–2019; John Slepian 2019–2020; Gustavo Plascencia, 2020–present.

Campus

The school's main building is located at 25 NE 2nd Street, Miami, and holds other classes on the Miami Dade College Wolfson Campus.

Much like the school today, all of its classes were held in different buildings in downtown Miami when the school opened, including the main building of MDC Wolfson campus, as well as space at the Christ Fellowship church at 500 N.E. 1st Avenue, where drawing classes were held on the top floor. The school's current main building (a former AT&T communications department building) was first used for the 1990-1991 school year, as an electrical fire destroyed the school's original administration headquarters.  The main building (the 5000 Building) houses most of the high school academic classes there, as well as both the high school and college administration units, dance studios, theaters, and art studios.  The MDC Wolfson Science building (the 2000 Building, located at 300 NE 2nd Avenue) houses the science facilities.  All music classes are held across the street from the MDC Wolfson Building at the aptly named Music Building (the 4000 Building, located at 401 NE 2nd Avenue; also houses MDC's Literary Center).

High school admissions and enrollment
Admission to New World School of the Arts is determined by a performance audition or a portfolio review. For detailed information, see the audition requirements for each division on its website. It serves as both a college and a high school; it is the only high school conservatory in Miami-Dade County. NWSA continued the PAVAC model of admission based entirely on audition. This differs from other Miami-Dade County Public School (MDCPS) magnets which are not VPA (visual and performing arts) magnets, which have a mixed model of entrance eligibility requirements and lottery. Also unlike the other MDCPS magnets, but like other VPA magnets, it does not have the "sibling rule", a policy of giving priority if a student's sibling is already attending the magnet school.

In 2011, 1,268 students applied for admission to New World, competing for 140 available spots. This gives New World an 11% admissions rate, making it one of Miami's most competitive public high schools.

Total enrollment for 2009–10 was 828, with 473 in the high school and 355 in the college.

School demographics for 2009–10 were 35% male and 65% female; 42% Hispanic (of any race), 36% White non-Hispanic, 19% Black, 3% Asian, and  less than 1% other.

Notable alumni

 Russell Thomas, opera singer
Mollye Asher, Academy Award-winning producer  (Nomadland)
 Michael Aronov, Tony Award-winning actor  (Oslo)
 Tarell Alvin McCraney, co-writer of Moonlight, Academy Award winner, chair of playwriting at the Yale School of Drama
 Hernan Bas, artist
 Robert Battle, choreographer, artistic director of the Alvin Ailey American Dance Theater
 Jennifer R. Blake, actress (Behaving Badly)
 Andréa Burns, stage actress
 Dennis Calero, artist, Harvey Award-nominated comic book illustrator
 Jencarlos Canela, actor, singer, composer, model
 Bernard Chang, graphic novel illustrator
 Alexis Cole, jazz singer
 Billy Corben, documentary film director (Cocaine Cowboys, The U)
 Cote de Pablo, actress, recording artist (NCIS)
 Masha Dashkina Maddux, former principal dancer at the Martha Graham Dance Company
 David Del Rio, stage and television actor (The Troop)
 Lili Estefan, model and talk show host (El Gordo y la Flaca)
 Katie Finneran, Tony Award-winning actress
 Brandon Flynn, actor in 13 Reasons Why
 Glenn Howerton, actor (It's Always Sunny in Philadelphia)
 Alex Lacamoire, Grammy Award and Tony Award-winning orchestrator and producer (In the Heights); (Hamilton)
 John Paul Leon, Eisner Award-nominated illustrator
 Erik Liberman, Broadway and TV actor, author
 Josie Lopez, actress (Make It or Break It)
 Ally Love, host of the Brooklyn Nets and a Peloton fitness instructor
 Mia Michaels, Emmy Award-winning choreographer (So You Think You Can Dance)
 Samantha Robinson, actress (The Love Witch)
 Julio Miranda, Emmy award-winning animator
 Cesar Santos, artist best known for coining the art term syncretism
 Sarah Spiegel, singer-actress
 Jen Stark, artist
 Marcus Strickland, jazz saxophonist
 Jessica Sutta, singer-songwriter, dancer, actress (The Pussycat Dolls)
 Lulu Wang,  filmmaker (The Farewell)

See also
 Miami-Dade County Public Schools
 Magnet school
 Education in the United States

References

External links
How New World School of the Arts got its start (thanks to PAVAC)
New World School of the Arts website
Miami-Dade County Public Schools
NWSA PTSA
NWSA alumni
PAVAC on Facebook
Early history, about Ed Love
Timeline of NWSA administration and faculty
Planning an Arts Centered School, Dana Foundation Chapter 4: Developing the Drama Curriculum at the New World School of the Arts, by Jorge Guerra-Castro

Education in Miami
High schools in Miami-Dade County, Florida
Magnet schools in Florida
Miami Dade College
Miami-Dade County Public Schools
Performing arts education in the United States
Schools of the performing arts in the United States
University of Florida
Public high schools in Florida
Performing arts in Florida
1987 establishments in Florida
Educational institutions established in 1987